Kim Young-chul (born 30 June 1976) is a former South Korean footballer. Kim played as a centre-back for South Korean national team in the 2006 FIFA World Cup. He is currently the manager of Gangseo University.

Club career

International career

Career statistics

Club

International
Results list South Korea's goal tally first.

Honours
Seongnam Ilhwa Chunma
K League 1: 2001, 2002, 2006
Korean FA Cup: 1999
Korean League Cup: 2002
Korean Super Cup: 2002

South Korea U23
Asian Games bronze medal: 2002

Individual
K League 1 Best XI: 2005, 2006

References

External links
 
 National Team Player Record 
 
 

2000 CONCACAF Gold Cup players
2006 FIFA World Cup players
Bucheon FC 1995 players
Jeonnam Dragons players
Gimcheon Sangmu FC players
Seongnam FC players
K3 League players
K League 1 players
South Korean footballers
South Korea international footballers
Association football central defenders
Konkuk University alumni
Sportspeople from Incheon
1976 births
Living people
Asian Games medalists in football
Footballers at the 2002 Asian Games
Asian Games bronze medalists for South Korea
Medalists at the 2002 Asian Games